Gerd Ab (also Romanized as Gerd Āb; also known as Gerdāb Langā and Langā) is a village in Langarud Rural District, Salman Shahr District, Abbasabad County, Mazandaran Province, Iran. At the 2006 census, its population was 328, in 83 families.

References 

Populated places in Abbasabad County